Tablas may refer to:

 Tablas Island, an island in Romblon Province, Philippines
 Tablas Strait, a strait in the Philippines
 Tablas Airport or Tugdan Airport, an airport in Romblon Province, Philippines
 Tabla, a hand drum used in Indian classical music
 Dupuș village (Táblás in Hungarian), Ațel Commune, Sibiu County, Romania